José Samuel Teuber Coser (born 13 February 1987), known as Samuel Teuber, is a Chilean former footballer who played as a striker.

Career

Born in Chuquicamata, Teuber began his football career at Universidad Católica, Chilean powerhouse club of Las Condes. After many years in Universidad Católica's youth system, he moved to Deportes Puerto Montt in 2004, joining three years after to Everton, in where he scored one goal in eleven matches during his debut season. The next season, Teuber signed for Provincial Osorno, in where he played along with his brother Marcelo.

O'Higgins

In January 2009, he joined to O'Higgins, team managed by Jorge Sampaoli in that moment. After very successful seasons at the team of Rancagua, Teuber completed a six-month loan with Italian Serie B side Grosseto in 2011, but on mid year, Teuber returned to his old team for play the Clausura Tournament, after an unsuccessful spell in Europe.

International career
After representing Chile U20 at both a tournament in Japan and a friendly match against Mexico U20, he had the opportunity of integrate the final squad that achieved the third place at the 2007 FIFA U-20 World Cup held in Canada, but the coach José Sulantay not included him in the 23-man squad.

Personal life
He is the younger brother of the former footballer Marcelo Teuber.

After football
Since 2017, he has worked as manager of FTA Tour USA, organising football tennis tournaments in countries such as the United States and Chile.

References

External links
 Teuber at Football-Lineups.com
 
 

1987 births
Living people
People from El Loa Province
Chilean people of German descent
Chilean footballers
Chile under-20 international footballers
Chilean expatriate footballers
Puerto Montt footballers
Everton de Viña del Mar footballers
Provincial Osorno footballers
O'Higgins F.C. footballers
F.C. Grosseto S.S.D. players
Club Deportivo Palestino footballers
Santiago Morning footballers
Tercera División de Chile players
Chilean Primera División players
Serie B players
Primera B de Chile players
Chilean expatriate sportspeople in Italy
Expatriate footballers in Italy
Association football forwards